Frere Hospital is a large, provincial, government funded hospital situated in East London, Eastern Cape in South Africa. It was established in 1881 and is a tertiary teaching hospital. Frere Hospital is named after Sir Henry Bartle Frere, Governor of the Cape Colony from 1877 to 1880.

Departments and services
The hospital departments include Trauma and Emergency department, Orthopaedic surgery, Paediatrics, Obstetrics/Gynecology, Surgery, Internal Medicine, ARV clinic for HIV/AIDS in adults and children, Anaesthetics, Family Medicine, Dermatology, Oncology for adult and paediatric patients and burns unit.

The other surgical specialties include Neurosurgery, Urology, Paediatric Surgery, Otolaryngology (ENT), Ophthalmology and Maxillofacial surgery.

The facilities include Operating Theatre, Endoscopy Theatre, Intensive Care Unit (ICU) for adult, paediatric and neonatal patients, high care wards for general and obstetric patients and Haemodialysis suite.

Frere also offers allied health services such as Physiotherapy, Occupational Therapy, Speech and Language Therapy, Audiology, Psychology, Social workers, Orthotics, Dentistry and Dietetics.

Other services include CSSD Services, Pharmacy, Occupational Services, X-ray Services with Computed Tomography (CT), Magnetic Resonance Imaging (MRI) and mammography facility, NHLS Laboratory, Blood Bank, Laundry Services, Kitchen Services and Mortuary.

GPS coordinates of the entrance gate in Amalinda Main Road:

References
 Frere Hospital

East London, Eastern Cape
Teaching hospitals in South Africa